Let It Shine (Simplified Chinese: 萤火虫的梦) is a Singaporean Chinese drama which was telecast on Singapore's free-to-air channel, MediaCorp TV Channel 8. It made its debut on 16 January 2007 and ended its 20-episode run on 12 February 2007.

The show achieved pretty low viewership rates for a local drama serial in Singapore. Less than 250,000 viewers tuned into the premiere episode, making it one of the more least-watched Singaporean television dramas. In fact, the figures was the lowest for all Singapore Chinese Dramas in the year of 2007.

Despite this show being a teenage idol drama, 23.5% of the viewers were actually housewives, while only about 14.5% were students and teenagers.

Viewership Rating

Cast

Main Cast

Other Cast

Reception
Many had criticized this show for being a replica of another Hong Kong drama series, Shine On You, as they had very similar content, and even the show titles were similar.

External links
Let It Shine Theme Song
Official Website (English Edition)
Official Website (Chinese Edition)

Singapore Chinese dramas
2007 Singaporean television series debuts
2007 Singaporean television series endings
Channel 8 (Singapore) original programming